Tsakhkashen or Tsaghkashen or Tsaghkachen may refer to:
Tsaghkashen, Aragatsotn, Armenia
Tsaghkashen, Ararat, Armenia
Tsaghkashen, Gegharkunik, Armenia
Sizavet, Armenia, formerly Tsakhkashen
Tsaghkaber, Armenia, formerly Tsakhkashen